Noelle Maritz (born 23 December 1995) is a professional footballer who plays as a defender for Arsenal of the FA WSL. She previously played for VfL Wolfsburg in the German Bundesliga and FC Zürich in Switzerland's Nationalliga A. Born in the United States, she represents Switzerland at international level.

Club career
Noelle Maritz started playing football at age four in Newport Beach, California. When her family moved to the East Coast, she transferred to the Players Development Academy in New Jersey.  After playing in the United States up to U13, she returned to her ancestral homeland, Switzerland, in the summer of 2005.

There she first played for the local club FC Amriswil in the D-Jugend before moving to FC Staad in the summer of 2007.  There she was able to recommend herself for the Swiss youth selection and spent three years in the training center of the Swiss Football Association in Huttwil. At the same time, Maritz played at FC Wil in youth football with the boys U13, U14, and U15.

After these three years, she signed her first player contract with FC Zürich for the 2011/2012 season. There she gave her senior debut in the National League A on August 6, 2011 against SC Schwyz.  She played 28 games in two years and scored one goal for Zurich in the NLA before signing for German treble winners VfL Wolfsburg on May 20, 2013.  Wolfsburg coach Ralf Kellermann signed Maritz in 2013 on the strength of her national team performances in Cyprus.  In her first year at VfL Wolfsburg, Maritz played in 15 of 22 Bundesliga games and won the double with the club this season, consisting of a championship and a Champions League. She joined Arsenal FC for the 2020/21 season.  She made her Arsenal debut in their opening game against Reading on 6 September 2020, playing the whole 90 minutes.

International career
Noelle Maritz has been a senior Switzerland international since 2013, after taking part in the 2012 U17 European Championship in Switzerland and the 2017 U20 World Cup in Japan. She made her senior international debut on March 6, 2013 against the Canada national team as part of the Cyprus Cup.  In 2013/14 Maritz qualified with the Swiss national team for the 2015 World Cup in Canada, where she was in the starting line-up in each of the four World Cup games, but was eliminated by a 0-1 defeat in the round of 16 against the hosts. In qualifying for the Euro 2017 she had four missions. The Swiss were also able to qualify for European Championship finals for the first time, where they played in the three group games. With one win, one draw, and one defeat each, they were eliminated after the group stage. In qualifying for the 2019 World Cup, she played in the twelve games played by the Swiss. They ultimately missed out on their second appearance at the World Cup after losing twice in the playoffs of the runners-up to European champions Netherlands. They had previously missed out on direct qualification due to a goalless draw in the last group match against Poland. Maritz took part in the 2022 European Championship and was in the starting line-up for the Swiss in all three group games. Switzerland was eliminated after the preliminary round.

Personal life
Maritz was born in the United States, growing up in Newport Beach, CA and Hillsborough, NJ, and moved to Switzerland in the canton of Thurgau when she was ten. Therefore, she has dual citizenship.

Because she was born in the state of California, her name is officially spelled without accents as "Noelle", instead of the usual "Noëlle", according to the state's naming laws where names should only consist of letters in the English alphabet.

Honours
FC Zürich
 Swiss Women's Super League: 2012, 2013
 Swiss Women's Cup: 2012, 2013

VfL Wolfsburg
 Bundesliga: 2013–14, 2016–17, 2017–18, 2018–19, 2019–20
 DFB-Pokal: 2015, 2016, 2017, 2018, 2019, 2020
 UEFA Women's Champions League: 2014
Arsenal
 FA Women's League Cup: 2022–23

References

External links

 

1995 births
Living people
Swiss women's footballers
American people of Swiss descent
Swiss people of American descent
People from Newport Beach, California
American emigrants to Switzerland
Soccer players from California
VfL Wolfsburg (women) players
Switzerland women's international footballers
2015 FIFA Women's World Cup players
Women's association football defenders
American women's soccer players
FC Zürich Frauen players
Swiss Women's Super League players
Swiss expatriate women's footballers
American expatriate women's soccer players
Swiss expatriate sportspeople in Germany
American expatriate soccer players in Germany
Swiss expatriate sportspeople in England
American expatriate sportspeople in England
Expatriate women's footballers in England
Arsenal W.F.C. players
21st-century American women
UEFA Women's Euro 2022 players
Frauen-Bundesliga players
UEFA Women's Euro 2017 players
FIFA Century Club